Columbus Boulevard (formerly Delaware Avenue) is a major north-south thoroughfare in Philadelphia, Pennsylvania.  It is famous for being the location of the Penn's Landing area and is generally parallel with Interstate 95 south of the Benjamin Franklin Bridge.  The road extends south towards Pattison Avenue and is home to many big box retailers between Snyder Avenue and Oregon Avenue.  

The street originated as an informal footpath connecting the docks and piers along the waterfront, a major Atlantic seaport. In 1831, the Philadelphia banker Stephen Girard, died and left the City $500,000 to construct a wide boulevard in its place, to be known as Delaware Avenue. The portion south of Spring Garden Street was controversially renamed after Christopher Columbus in 1992 despite opposition from residents north of Center City Philadelphia and the Lenape (also known as Delaware) nation. Many Philadelphians continue to refer to it as Delaware Avenue.  Some older maps of Philadelphia show this route as once being part of Pennsylvania Route 291.

History

Delaware Avenue was originally a "major freshwater port" which has recently seen revitalization with the increase in tourism and the start of casino businesses in the 2000s.  The boulevard was dedicated in 1992 as the Italian Americans persuaded city hall to rename the portion of Delaware Avenue south of Spring Garden Street on the 500th anniversary of Christopher Columbus sailing to America.  The 106-foot-tall Christopher Columbus monument  was dedicated in the same year.

References

External links
Historic photos of Delaware Avenue from the Temple University Libraries Digital Collections at Temple University

Streets in Philadelphia
Boulevards in the United States